Janet Richards may refer to:

 Janet Richards (Egyptologist) (born 1959), American Egyptologist
 Janet Radcliffe Richards (born 1944), British philosopher
 Janet C. Richards, American literacy scholar
 Janet Elizabeth Richards, American writer and lecturer

See also
 Janet Richard, Maltese athlete